The Vayalar Award is given for the best literary work in Malayalam. The award was instituted in 1977 by the Vayalar Ramavarma Memorial Trust in memory of the poet and lyricist Vayalar Ramavarma (1928-1975). A sum of 25,000, a silver plate and certificate constituted the award originally. Now it is raised to a sum of 1,00,000. It is presented each year on 27 October, the death anniversary of Vayalar Ramavarma.

List of awardees

See also
 List of Malayalam literary awards

References

Indian literary awards
Awards established in 1977
Malayalam literary awards
1977 establishments in Kerala